Telimenella is a genus of fungi in the family Phyllachoraceae.

Species
As accepted by Species Fungorum;
Telimenella gangraena 
Telimenella phacidioidea 

Former species; T. persica  = Telimenella gangraena

References

External links
Index Fungorum

Phyllachorales
Sordariomycetes genera